Samuel Jackson was an American Negro league catcher in the 1880s.

Jackson played for the Pittsburgh Keystones in 1887. In four recorded games, he posted five hits in 18 plate appearances.

References

External links
Baseball statistics and player information from Baseball-Reference Black Baseball Stats and Seamheads

Year of birth missing
Year of death missing
Place of birth missing
Place of death missing
Pittsburgh Keystones players
Baseball catchers